The bibliography of Flannery O'Connor includes two novels, more than thirty short stories, and several collections.

Novels
 Wise Blood (1952)
 The Violent Bear It Away (1960)

Collections
 A Good Man Is Hard to Find and Other Stories (1955)
 Three (1962)
 Everything That Rises Must Converge (1965)
 The Complete Stories (1971)
 Flannery O'Connor: Collected Works (1988)
 Flannery O'Connor: The Cartoons (2012)

Short stories
 "The Geranium" (1946)
 "The Barber" (1948)
 "Wildcat" (1970)
 "The Crop" (1971)
 "The Turkey", "The Capture" (1948)
 "The Train" (1948)
 "The Peeler" (1949)
 "The Heart of the Park" (1949)
 "A Stroke of Good Fortune", "A Woman on the Stairs" (1949)
 "Enoch and the Gorilla" (1952)
 "A Good Man Is Hard to Find" (1953)
 "A Late Encounter with the Enemy" (1953)
 "The Life You Save May Be Your Own" (1953)
 "The River" (1953)
 "A Circle in the Fire" (1954)
 "The Displaced Person" (1954)
 "A Temple of the Holy Ghost" (1954)
 "The Artificial Nigger" (1955)
 "Good Country People" (1955)
 "You Can't Be Any Poorer Than Dead" (1955)
 "Greenleaf" (1956)
 "A View of the Woods" (1957)
 "The Enduring Chill" (1958)
 "The Comforts of Home" (1960)
 "Everything That Rises Must Converge" (1961)
 "The Partridge Festival" (1961)
 "The Lame Shall Enter First" (1962)
 "Why Do the Heathen Rage?" (1963)
 "Revelation" (1964)
 "Parker's Back" (1965)
 "Judgement Day" (1965)
 "An Afternoon in the Woods" (1988)

Non-fiction, letters, interviews
 Mystery and Manners: Occasional Prose (1969)
 The Habit of Being: Letters of Flannery O'Connor (1979)
 The Presence of Grace: and Other Book Reviews (1983)
 The Correspondence of Flannery O'Connor and the Brainard Cheneys (1986)
 Conversations with Flannery O'Connor (1989)
 The Manuscripts of Flannery O'Connor at Georgia College (1989)
 A Prayer Journal (2013)
 Good Things out of Nazareth: The Uncollected Letters of Flannery O'Connor and Friends (2019)

Notes

References

 
 
 
 
 
 

Bibliographies by writer
Bibliographies of American writers
Christian bibliographies